Robert Charles Vaughan may refer to:

 Robert Charles Vaughan (1883–1966), Canadian railway executive
 Robert Charles "Bob" Vaughan (born 1945), British mathematician